Jermaine "Jerry" Hue (born 15 June 1978 in Morant Bay, St Thomas, Jamaica) is a retired professional football midfielder who formerly played for Harbour View and the Jamaica national football team.

Club career
Hue started his playing career for Jamaica National Premier League Harbour View, with whom he won the 2004–2005 National Premier League Championship. He joined Harbour View's U-14 in 1993, before making his first team debut in 1998. He was also the 1999–2000 Premier League MVP.

Jermaine also played for Mandela United of the B.I.S.L. (New York a league from which came Stern John and others who went on to play Major league soccer) where he was spotted by major league scouts.

Next up was a move to the Kansas City Wizards of the American Major League Soccer in September 2005, where he spent one season before moving onto Mjällby of Sweden in 2006. He only played 9 games for them in 2006 before returning to Jamaica.

On 26 September 2013, Jermaine Hue was banned for nine months after testing positive for a banned substance at the World Cup qualifier away to Honduras in June.

International career
Hue made his debut with the Reggae Boyz, the Jamaica national team, in 1999. He scored goals against Guatemala and South Africa at the 2005 CONCACAF Gold Cup.

International goals
Scores and results list Jamaica's goal tally first.

Honors

Harbour View 
Jamaica National Premier League:
 Winner (3): 2000, 2007, 2010
JFF Champions Cup:
 Winner (2): 2001, 2002
 Runner-up (2): 2003, 2005
CFU Club Championship:
 Winner (2): 2004, 2007

Jamaica 
Caribbean Cup:
Winner (1): 2005

References

External links

 Profile at TheReggaeBoyz
 Profile at Reggaeboyzsc
 
 

1978 births
Living people
Association football midfielders
Jamaica international footballers
2005 CONCACAF Gold Cup players
Jamaican expatriate footballers
Expatriate footballers in Sweden
Expatriate soccer players in the United States
Jamaican footballers
Sporting Kansas City players
People from Saint Thomas Parish, Jamaica
Superettan players
Harbour View F.C. players
Mjällby AIF players
Major League Soccer players
Expatriate footballers in Trinidad and Tobago
TT Pro League players
Doping cases in association football
National Premier League players